Philip H. Haralson (November 3, 1851, Macon, Georgia - March 1934, Atlanta) was a prominent Atlanta lawyer. At one time he headed up the Committee on Manufactures and Statistics. and at another  went into real estate investment in Cuba. He married Mary E. Morris in 1881. Haralson had his mansion in the Inman Park neighborhood of Atlanta. He was buried in Oakland Cemetery.

References

People from Atlanta
People from Macon, Georgia
1851 births
1934 deaths
Georgia (U.S. state) lawyers
Burials at Oakland Cemetery (Atlanta)